"Walking in the Sunshine" is a song by British 2-tone/ska band Bad Manners, released in September 1981 as the second single from their third album Gosh It's... Bad Manners. It peaked at number 10 on the UK Singles Chart.

Reception 
Reviewing the song for Record Mirror, Sunie Fletcher wrote "Buster and the boys pull themselves out of their role as a second-rate Madness, only to emerge as… would you believe a third-rate UB40? The exuberance of their previous works has vanished, leaving behind a listless, limber reggae item which seems to drift on for far more than its three minutes 26 seconds". However, Ian Birch for Smash Hits wrote "It's amazing how Bad Manners can look so slobby and make such a sophisticated single. This is a dapper pop song with an ambling reggae gait and some fine instrumental breaks".

Track listing 
7": Magnet / MAG 197

 "Walking in the Sunshine" – 3:26
 "End of the World" – 2:57

12": Magnet / 12 MAG 197

 "Walking in the Sunshine" (Extended Version) – 5:33
 "End of the World" – 2:57
 "Night Bus to Dalston" (Vocals Version) – 2:14

Charts

References 

1981 singles
1981 songs
Magnet Records singles
Bad Manners songs